The Money Machine was a show on ZDTV, and later TechTV, hosted by Carmine Gallo.  The show offered investment advice to viewers, predominantly on how to begin investing via the internet. When TechLive debuted in 2001, The Money Machine was discontinued in favor of money segments during the new show. It aired from ZDTV's launch to April 1, 2001.

External links

TechTV original programming
Business-related television series